Cheat Canyon Wildlife Management Area is located on  northwest of Albright in Preston County, West Virginia. The wildlife management area is centered on the Cheat River canyon.

Cheat Canyon WMA was purchased at a cost of over $7 million in 2014.  Governor Earl Ray Tomblin dedicated the area  on September 12, 2014.

See also
Animal conservation
Fishing
Hunting
List of West Virginia wildlife management areas

References

External links
West Virginia DNR District 1 Wildlife Management Areas
West Virginia Hunting Regulations
West Virginia Fishing Regulations

Wildlife management areas of West Virginia
Protected areas of Preston County, West Virginia